Northwest High School or North West High School may refer to:

All of the following are in the United States:
Northwest High School (Indiana), Indianapolis, Indiana
Northwest High School (Louisiana), Opelousas, Louisiana
Northwest High School (Maryland), Germantown, Maryland
Northwest High School (Michigan), Jackson, Michigan
Northwest High School (Missouri), Cedar Hill, Missouri
Northwest High School (Grand Island, Nebraska)
Northwest High School, Shiprock, New Mexico, operated by Shiprock Associated Schools, Inc.
Northwest High School (Canal Fulton, Ohio)
Northwest High School (Cincinnati, Ohio)
Northwest High School (Tennessee), Clarksville, Tennessee
Northwest High School (Texas), in Fort Worth, Texas (Justin postal address)

Similar high school names 
All of the following are in the United States:
 Blue Valley Northwest High School, in Overland Park, Kansas
 Northwest Cabarrus High School, in Kannapolis, North Carolina
 Northwest Catholic High School, in West Hartford, Connecticut
 Northwest Christian High School (Arizona), in Phoenix, Arizona
 Northwest Christian High School (Bakersfield, California), a member of the Central Sierra League
 Northwest Christian High School (Lacey, Washington)
 Northwest Classen High School, in Oklahoma City, Oklahoma
 Northwest Guilford High School, in Guilford County, North Carolina
 Northwest Rankin High School, in Flowood, Mississippi
 Northwest Whitfield High School, in Whitfield County, Georgia
 Northwest Yeshiva High School, in Mercer Island, Washington
 Olathe Northwest High School, in Olathe, Kansas
 Omaha Northwest High School, in northwest Omaha, Nebraska
 Shawnee Mission Northwest High School, in Shawnee, Kansas
 Wichita Northwest High School, in Wichita, Kansas

See also
Northwestern High School (disambiguation)
Northwest School (disambiguation)